The Advanced Train Management System is a train control system under development by Lockheed Martin for Australian Rail Track Corporation (ARTC). The ATMS uses Global Positioning System to locate and track the position of trains within the ARTC network. In particular the system will be deployed across the Nullabor Plain to connect the eastern states of Australia with Perth and Western Australia.  ATMS has been proposed as a low cost functional equivalent to European Rail Traffic Management System.

Outline 

ATMS is a rail safe working system based on radio communication. Authorities are issues to equipped trains to allow them to proceed to a specified point. The ATMS compares the movement of an equipped train to the authority which has been issued, and then brakes the train if it exceeds the authority.

ATMS does not use balises, such as the ETCS system from Europe.

ATMS's particular strength is to improve safety and efficiency in remote areas where communications and power infrastructure is limited, such as in deserts. It thus involves a mixture of land-based and satellite technologies for communications and renewable power supplies due to lack of mains electricity in many cases.

Excellent following headways on single lines is provided, in excess of what is economically possible with conventional intermediate block signals. The cost of level crossing protection is reduced due to the elimination of the need for track circuits.

Trains speeds are regulated according to the speeds along the track and through turnouts (switches).

ATMS system components 

ATMS is composed of the following sub-systems:

Implementation 

After 10 years of development, ATMS has been implemented on the short Port Augusta to Whyalla railway. The next phase is between Port Augusta via Adelaide to Melbourne. The Inland Railway is to benefit from a $20m contract for its 1700 km of track.

Track borne equipment 
 Controls and detects turnouts aka points
 Controls and detects level crossings
 Detects landslip detectors
 Detects power supplies
 Tunnels

Trainborne equipment 

Drivers use a touch screen device located in the console – called a Driver Machine Interface or DMI – which 
provides information on the train’s movement and integrity, authority, target speed location, as well as other 
traffic, geographic and track features.
The DMI enhances a driver’s situational awareness through a 10 km ‘look ahead’ view of work sites and 
changes in network conditions. A blue column bar represents the train’s length, direction of travel as well as 
the kilometre post position. The lower green horizontal line represents the train’s movement authority. Once a 
train has an authority, it can continue to the limit of its authority autonomously even if communications fail.
Before moving into ATMS territory, the train communicates with the Network Control Centre (NCC) and the 
driver enters data via the DMI - digitally connecting the driver, train and NCC in real time.
Train crews are automatically advised of speed restrictions, approaching speed limit changes as well as track 
work locations. When a train is within 10 km of a temporary speed restriction, a yellow braking curve followed 
by an alert will appear on the DMI.

The Location Determination System (LDS) software uses a highly sophisticated dual feed from two GPS 
antennas to fix the train’s location. The software compares these two GPS inputs then further compares 
onboard sensors, the tachometer, and the track database to exactly fix the train’s location. Under normal 
conditions, location reporting to ATMS occurs every 15 seconds. 
The Train Control & Display (TC&D) software controls train functions such as train integrity monitoring, 
braking enforcement, driver display management and message exchange between the DMI and AMS.

End of train unit

Timeline

2021 
 Port Augusta - Kalgoorlie section

2020 
 Inland Railway contract for $30m.

2018 
 Port Augusta - Whyalla section

2013 
Because of delays in the development of ATMS, it was decided to equip the Port Augusta - Tarcoola section with conventional CTC signalling.

2005 
 ARTC - Lockheed Martin agreement.

Other systems 
 ERTMS
 Positive train control (PTC)

See also 
 Railpage 
 Funding

References 

Lockheed Martin
Rail infrastructure in Australia
Rail technologies